Erich Zakowski (born 25 November 1934 in East Prussia) is a German master mechanic, and the founder and longtime head of the Zakspeed racing team.

After the Second World War, Zakowski fled from Prussia with his mother and four siblings initially to Dortmund then Hamburg and finally the family settled in Niederzissen. Zakowski graduated in Andernach as an apprentice auto mechanic, and passed his master exam. He founded his own garage in Niederzissen, which was the location of the Zakspeed racing operation, starting in 1968. In 1968, under the name "Zakowski Niederzissen tuning", he started using a Ford Escort for the Eifel race on the Nürburgring.

In the 1970s and 1980s, under the direction of Erich Zakowski, Zakspeed established itself in various racing series, (especially in sports car racing). Zakspeed entered the Formula 1 series in 1985. In 1990, after five years of racing, Zakowski retired active leadership of the team and handed it to his son Peter.

References

Formula One team owners
Formula One team principals
German motorsport people
1934 births
Living people
Zakspeed